Di Paola or DiPaola is an Italian surname, and may refer to:
Giampaolo Di Paola, Italian naval officer
Manuel Di Paola, Italian footballer
Andrea Di Paola, Italian astronomer
Vicente Di Paola, Argentinian footballer
James DiPaola, American sheriff
Francesco di Paola Cassetta, Italian cardinal
Josip Franjo di Paola Nowak, Italian archbishop
Francesco di Paola Villadecani, Italian cardinal

See also
San Francesco di Paola, Naples, church
San Francesco di Paola, Milan, church
San Francesco di Paola, Florence, church
San Francesco di Paola, Venice, church
San Francesco di Paola ai Monti, church

Italian-language surnames